A Witness Out of the Blue is a 2019 Hong Kong crime thriller film produced by Derek Yee and written and directed by Andrew Fung. The film stars Louis Koo as a robber who becomes a prime suspect of a new murder case in which the only witness is a talking parrot present during the scene. A Witness Out of the Blue premiered at the Hong Kong Asian Film Festival on 18 October 2019 before it was theatrically released on 24 October 2019 in Hong Kong. The film was also shown at the International Film Festival Rotterdam from 28 January to 1 February 2020.

Plot
Sean Wong (Louis Koo) leads an armed robbery at a jewelry shop. Three months later, Wong's partner in crime, Homer Tsui (Deep Ng), is found dead inside an apartment and Chief Inspector Yip Sau-ching (Philip Keung) suspects Wong to be the culprit in the murder of Tsui. The only apparent witness to the murder case is a talking parrot that was present inside the apartment room during the crime scene. Wong sets out to find out the real murderer in order to clear his name and avenge his partner.

Cast
Louis Koo as Sean Wong (汪新元)
Louis Cheung as Larry Lam (林法樑)
Jessica Hsuan as Joy Ting (丁喜悅)
Cherry Ngan as Charmaine Hui (許少梅)
Philip Keung as Yip Sau-ching (葉守正)
Fiona Sit as Cindy Yeung (楊見珊)
Patrick Tam as Bull Yiu (姚笙)
Andy On as Tony Ho (何兆東)
Ling Man-lung as Redhead (洪小武)
Sam Lee as Clark Au-yeung (歐陽剋儉)
Evergreen Mak as Crab (昌哥)
Power Chan as Donkey (大雄)
Tsui Kwong-lam as Uncle Monk (凱叔)
Annie Liu as Ms. Expert (special appearance)
Jacky Cai as Au-yeung's girlfriend (special appearance)
Ng Siu-hin as Handiwork (手作仔) (special appearance)
Deno Cheung as Lui Yau-piu (雷友彪)
Chan Kin-on as Internal affairs officer
Chan Lai-wan as Bull's mother
Amy Tam as Donkey's wife
Terry Zou as Harry (亨少)
Danny Chan as Bad guy
Aaron Chow as Food delivery guy
Ben Cheung as Keeper
Andrew Fung as Footballer
Law Wing-cheung as Cafe owner

Critical reception
A Witness Out of the Blue received generally positive reviews. Edmund Lee of the South China Morning Post gave the film a score  of 3.5/5 stars, praising the performances by Louis Koo and Louis Cheung, and describes the film as director Andrew Fung's best effort to date. Gabriel Chong of Movie Xclusive gave the film a similar score of 3.5/5, praising Koo's commitment to his role and the well-paced mystery from start to end. Andrew Chan of Film Critics Circle of Australia gave the film a score of 7.5/10 on his blog, praising the performances by the cast and sums up the film as "an effective crime thriller that lacks a sharpening cutting edge."

Awards and nominations

References

External links

2019 films
2019 crime thriller films
2010s mystery thriller films
Hong Kong crime thriller films
Hong Kong mystery thriller films
Murder mystery films
Police detective films
Media Asia films
2010s Cantonese-language films
Films about murder
Films set in Hong Kong
Films shot in Hong Kong
2010s Hong Kong films